Discovery system can mean:

Discovery system (bibliographic search), a type of bibliographical search system
Discovery system (AI research), an artificial intelligence system that attempts to discover new scientific concepts or laws